Wolfshead: The Legend of Robin Hood is an adventure film directed by John Hough and starring David Warbeck, Ciaran Madden, Kathleen Byron, David Butler and Kenneth Gilbert. The film was the debut movie of actor David Warbeck as Robin Hood. The film was originally a 1969 television series pilot but was released in movie theatres in 1973, as a support feature to the musical Take Me High.  The film was also released on VHS under the title The Legend of Young Robin Hood.

The film's title comes from the medieval term Caput lupinum or "Wolfshead", meaning an outlaw.

Plot
The film is set in the year 1190AD. Robert of Loxley, a simple farmer, is working his land when a fellow Saxon runs through their property attempting to escape Sir Jeffrey and the Royal Game Warden. Robert denies seeing the alleged poacher, and the fight, which ensues, is destined to seal his fate.

When Sir Jeffrey's brother, Roger of Doncaster, learns that Robert of Loxley was not killed for his insolence, he determines to use the incident to have him arrested and his lands confiscated. Sir Roger's ulterior motive is that his intended bride Lady Marian Fitzwater has had feelings for Robert from childhood and this stands in the way of his marriage to her. So he enlists the help of the Abbott to have Robert made a Wolfshead: an outlaw whose head is worth that of a wolf's, dead or alive.

Cast
 David Warbeck as Robert of Locksley
 Kathleen Byron as Katherine of Locksley
 Dan Meaden as John Little of Cumberland
 Ciaran Madden as Lady Marian Fitzwalter
 Kenneth Gilbert as Friar Tuck
 Joe Cook as Much
 Derrick Gilbert as Wat
 David Butler as Will Stukely
 Patrick O'Dwyer as Tom
 Peter Stephens as Abbot of St. Mary's
 Christopher Robbie as Roger of Doncaster
 Roy Boyd as Geoffrey of Doncaster
 Pamela Roland as Adele
 Inigo Jackson as Legros
 Will Knightley as Abbot's Secretary
 Roy Evans as Gyrth
 Reg Lever as Old Wat
 Kim Braden as Alice
 Sheraton Blount as Abbie
 Nicholas Jones as Squire
 Sheelagh Wilcocks as Nurse

Reception and influence
Howard Maxford, in his book Hammer Complete praised Wolfshead as a "brisk and entertaining variation on an over-familiar tale." Maxford added that "the film's only drawback is its rather abrupt ending."

Writer Richard Carpenter later described  Wolfshead as an influence on his own series, Robin of Sherwood. Carpenter stated "What [Wolfshead] did was to have a very realistic look at being an outlaw in the 13th century and I wanted to have that element as well as the occult and humor."

References

External links
 

1969 films
British adventure films
Television films as pilots
1960s adventure films
Films directed by John Hough
Robin Hood films
Television pilots not picked up as a series
Films set in the 1190s
1960s English-language films
1960s British films